The  Arizona Rattlers season was the 19th season for the franchise in the Arena Football League. The team was coached by Kevin Guy and played their home games at US Airways Center. The Rattlers made the playoffs with a 10–6 record, fourth best in the National Conference, but were defeated by the top-seeded Spokane Shock in the conference semifinals, 49–57.

Standings

Regular season schedule
The Rattlers opened their season on the road against the Gladiators on April 3. They will host the Rush on April 17 for their first home game of the season. The conclusion of the regular season was at home on July 31 against the Barnstormers.

All times are EDT

Playoff schedule

All times are EDT

Final roster

Regular season

Week 1: at Cleveland Gladiators

The Rattlers' special teams returned 7 kickoffs for 212 yards and 3 returned for touchdowns against a Gladiators team that gave up only one kickoff return for a touchdown in the last season they competed. Arizona's Rod Windsor was the most common target for quarterback Nick Davila, with 13 catches for 175 yards and 2 touchdowns. Davila himself completed 26 passes for 273 yards and 4 touchdowns.

Week 2: BYE

Week 3: vs. Chicago Rush

Week 4: vs. Tulsa Talons

Rod Windsor's eighth touchdown of the night was the game winner for the Rattlers. On the final play of the game, on an untimed down, Windsor received a pass from Nick Davilla and hustled down the left side of the field, escaping two Tulsa defenders before reaching the end zone. Both teams went back-and-forth throughout the contest, with neither leading by more than one score at any point. The Rattlers finished with 419 yards of total offense, provided mostly by Nick Davilla who threw for 413 yards and 8 touchdowns. Windsor finished with 230 receiving yards, 6 touchdown receptions, and 2 rushing touchdowns. With the win, the Rattlers gave the Talons their first loss, while improving their own record to 2–1.

Week 5: at Tampa Bay Storm

Although they trailed nearly the entire night, the Rattlers stayed in it, but came up short in the end. Tied at 48–48, the Rattlers gave up a touchdown to the Storm, however the Storm's kicker missed the extra point. Arizona scored on the next play from scrimmage, and following a successful extra point, took a 55–54 lead. Tampa Bay would take the lead back on a 37-yard passing touchdown, but rather than try another extra point, attempted a two-point conversion and made it, giving them a 62–55 lead. On Arizona's next drive covered 48 yards in just over a minute, ending with a touchdown with 7 seconds left. Instead of kicking an extra point, which would have tied the game, the Rattlers opted to go for two. Nick Davilla's pass to Anthony Mix was incomplete, although the Rattlers felt a defensive interference penalty should have been called on the play which would have given them a second chance at the conversion. No penalty was called however, and Arizona's ensuing onside kick was recovered by the Storm, effectively ending the game. Davilla finished the game with 314 yards and 7 touchdowns. J.J. McKelvey caught for 127 yards and 3 touchdowns.

Week 6: vs. Spokane Shock

Week 7: BYE

Week 8: at Iowa Barnstormers

Week 9: at Utah Blaze

Week 10: vs. Milwaukee Iron

Week 11: vs. Oklahoma City Yard Dawgz

Week 12: vs. Bossier–Shreveport Battle Wings

Week 13: at Jacksonville Sharks

Week 14: at Spokane Shock

Week 15: at Chicago Rush

Week 16: vs. Utah Blaze

The win, coupled with a loss by the Iowa Barnstormers, clinched a playoff berth for the Rattlers.

Week 17: at Tulsa Talons

Week 18: vs. Iowa Barnstormers

Playoffs

National Conference Semifinals: at Spokane Shock

References

Arizona Rattlers
Arizona Rattlers seasons
2010 in sports in Arizona
2010s in Phoenix, Arizona